Dimethenamid is a widely used herbicide. Dimethenamid is registered for control of annual grasses, certain annual broadleaf weeds and sedges in field corn, seed corn, popcorn and soybeans. Supplemental labeling also allows use on sweet corn,
grain sorghum, dry beans and peanuts.  In registering dimethinamide (SAN 582H/Frontier), EPA concluded that the primary means of dissipation of dimethenamid applied to the soil surface is photolysis, whereas below the surface loss was due largely to microbial metabolism.  The herbicide was found to undergo anaerobic microbial degradation under denitrifying, iron-reducing, sulfate-reducing, or methanogenic conditions.   In that study, more than half of the herbicide carbon (based on 14C-labeling) added was found to be incorporated irreversibly into soil-bound residue.

References

Herbicides
Thiophenes
Carboxamides
Ethers
Organochlorides
Methoxy compounds